Sonja Balun Harand (born 12 December 1955) is an Austrian former figure skater who competed in ladies' singles. She is a four-time Austrian national champion (1973–1976) and competed at the 1972 Winter Olympics, finishing 17th.

Born in Czechoslovakia, Balun is the daughter of the 1954 European bronze medalists in pair skating – Soňa Balunová and Miloslav Balun. The family arrived in Austria in 1967.

She married Olympic ice hockey player Kurt Harand.

Results

References

Navigation

Austrian female single skaters
Czech emigrants to Austria
Figure skaters at the 1972 Winter Olympics
Olympic figure skaters of Austria
1955 births
Living people